Cecil Washington "Turkey" Tyson (December 6, 1914 – February 17, 2000) nicknamed "Slim" was a Major League Baseball player.

Tyson is one of many ballplayers who only appeared in the major leagues during World War II. His MLB career consisted of one at bat as a pinch hitter for the Philadelphia Phillies at Braves Field on April 23, 1944. He went 0-for-1 for a batting average of .000. Tyson did not appear in the field. The 29-year-old rookie stood 6'5" and weighed 225 lbs.

He played 15 seasons in the minor leagues, beginning with the Tallahassee Capitals of the Georgia-Florida League and the Greenwood Dodgers of the Cotton States League in 1938.  His best minor league season was in 1940, when he had a batting average of .363 with 5 home runs for two separate teams.  His last minor league season was in 1952 with the Rocky Mount Leafs of the Coastal Plain League.  He was a first baseman and outfielder.

He died in his hometown of Elm City, North Carolina, at the age of 85.

External links

Philadelphia Phillies players
Hagerstown Owls players
Baseball players from North Carolina
1914 births
2000 deaths
People from Elm City, North Carolina
Lumberton Auctioneers players
Durham Bulls players
Greenwood Dodgers players
Martinsville Manufacturers players
Raleigh Capitals players
Rocky Mount Leafs players
Tallahassee Capitals players
Trenton Packers players
Utica Blue Sox players
Winston-Salem Twins players
Minor league baseball managers